The Crampton Baronetcy, of Merrion Square, in the City of Dublin, was a title in the Baronetage of the United Kingdom. It was created on 14 March 1839 for the Irish surgeon and anatomist Philip Crampton. He was succeeded by his son, the second baronet, who was a prominent diplomat. The title became extinct on the latter's death in 1886.

Crampton baronets, of Merrion Square, Dublin (1839)
Sir Philip Crampton, 1st Baronet (1777–1858)
Sir John Fiennes Twisleton Crampton, 2nd Baronet (1805–1886)

References

Extinct baronetcies in the Baronetage of the United Kingdom